In optics, spherical aberration (SA) is a type of aberration found in optical systems that have elements with spherical surfaces. Lenses and curved mirrors are prime examples, because this shape is easier to manufacture. Light rays that strike a spherical surface off-centre are refracted or reflected more or less than those that strike close to the centre. This deviation reduces the quality of images produced by optical systems. The effect of spherical aberration was first identified by Ibn al-Haytham who discussed it in his work Kitāb al-Manāẓir.

Overview
A spherical lens has an aplanatic point (i.e., no spherical aberration) only at a radius that equals the radius of the sphere divided by the index of refraction of the lens material.  A typical value of refractive index for crown glass is 1.5 (see list), which indicates that only about 43% of the area (67% of diameter) of a spherical lens is useful.  It is often considered to be an imperfection of telescopes and other instruments which makes their focusing less than ideal due to the spherical shape of lenses and mirrors. This is an important effect, because spherical shapes are much easier to produce than aspherical ones. In many cases, it is cheaper to use multiple spherical elements to compensate for spherical aberration than it is to use a single aspheric lens.

"Positive" spherical aberration means peripheral rays are bent too much. "Negative" spherical aberration means peripheral rays are not bent enough.

The effect is proportional to the fourth power of the diameter and inversely proportional to the third power of the focal length, so it is much more pronounced at short focal ratios, i.e., "fast" lenses.

Correction
In lens systems, aberrations can be minimized using combinations of convex and concave lenses, or by using aspheric lenses or aplanatic lenses. 

Lens systems with aberration correction are usually designed by numerical ray tracing. For simple designs one can sometimes analytically calculate parameters that minimize spherical aberration.
 The signs of the radii follow the Cartesian sign convention.

Particularly, light striking the inner part of the mirror focuses farther from the mirror than light striking the outer part. As a result, the image cannot be focused as sharply as if the aberration were not present.

Spherical aberration can be eliminated by making lenses with an aspheric surface. Descartes showed that lenses whose surfaces are well-chosen Cartesian ovals (revolved around the central symmetry axis) can perfectly image light from a point on the axis or from infinity in the direction of the axis. Such a design yields completely aberration-free focusing of light from a distant source.

In 2018, Rafael G. González-Acuña and Héctor A. Chaparro-Romo, graduate students at the National Autonomous University of Mexico and the Monterrey Institute of Technology and Higher Education in Mexico, found a closed formula for a lens surface that eliminates spherical aberration. Their equation can be applied to specify a shape for one surface of a lens, where the other surface has any given shape.

Estimation of the aberrated spot diameter
Many ways to estimate the diameter of the focused spot due to spherical aberration are based on ray optics. Ray optics, however, does not consider that light is an electromagnetic wave. Therefore, the results can be wrong due to interference effects.

Coddington notation
A rather simple formalism based on ray optics, which holds for thin lenses only, is the Coddington notation. In the following, n is the lens' refractive index, o is the object distance, i is the image distance, h is the distance from the optical axis at which the outermost ray enters the lens,  is the first lens radius,  is the second lens radius, and f is the lens' focal length. The distance h can be understood as half of the clear aperture.

By using the Coddington factors for shape, s, and position, p,

 

one can write the longitudinal spherical aberration as 

If the focal length, f, is very much larger than the longitudinal spherical aberration, LSA, then the transverse spherical aberration, TSA, which corresponds to the diameter of the focal spot is given by

See also
Achromatic lens
Hubble Space Telescope
Maksutov telescope
Parabolic reflector
Ritchey–Chrétien telescope
Schmidt corrector plate
Soft focus

References

External links
 Spherical aberration  at vanwalree.com, PA van Walree, viewed 28 January 2007.
 http://www.telescope-optics.net/spherical1.htm
 Non-English articles on the Acuña-Romo equation: Spanish, German, Italian, Russian

Geometrical optics

de:Abbildungsfehler#Sphärische Aberration